This is a list of Omani people based on an annual assessment of wealth and assets compiled and published by Forbes magazine, Hurun and Wealth-X.

Omanis by networth

See also
 The World's Billionaires
 List of countries by the number of billionaires

References

Omani
net worth
 
Billionaires